Samson is  1936 French drama film directed by Maurice Tourneur and starring Harry Baur, Gaby Morlay and André Lefaur. It was based on the 1908 play of the same title by Henri Bernstein, which had previously been made into three silent films. The film was shot at the Joinville Studios in Paris, with sets designed by the art director Guy de Gastyne.

Synopsis
An aristocratic woman is coerced by her impoverished family into marrying a wealthy business tycoon.

Cast
 Harry Baur as Jacques Brachart  
 Gaby Morlay as Anne-Marie d'Andeline  
 André Lefaur as Le Marquis Honoré d'Andeline  
 Gabrielle Dorziat as La Marquise d'Andeline  
 André Luguet as Jérôme 'Jessie' Le Govain 
 Suzy Prim as Grace Ritter  
 Christian-Gérard as Max d'Andeline  
 Maurice Bénard as Flash  
 Laure Diana as Christiane Roy 
 Léon Arvel as Grünbaum  
 Simone Barillier
 Raymond Blot as Un invité chez Christiane 
 Marie-Jacqueline Chantal as Lady Huxley  
 Nane Chaubert 
 Robert Clermont as Le maître d'hôtel 
 Nicole de Rouves as Une invitée chez Christiane  
 Ky Duyen as Le domestique de Le Govain  
 Foun-Sen as Le vendeuse de charité  
 Madeleine Geoffroy as Clotilde  
 Anthony Gildès as Un invité chez Christiane  
 Jean Joffre as Le directeur de la Voix Populaire  
 Jeanne Juillia 
 Jean Marconi as Un invité chez Christiane  
 Charles Redgie as Stanley  
 Fernande Saala 
 Guy Sloux as Un invité chez Christiane

References

Bibliography 
 Goble, Alan.  The Complete Index to Literary Sources in Film. Walter de Gruyter, 1999.

External links 
 

1936 films
French drama films
1936 drama films
1930s French-language films
Films directed by Maurice Tourneur
French films based on plays
Films shot at Joinville Studios
French black-and-white films
1930s French films